The 2010–11 Liga Nacional de Fútbol de Guatemala season is the 12th season in which the Apertura and Clausura season is used. The league season is divided into two tournaments, the Apertura, which is played from August to December, and the Clausura which is played from January to May.

Format
The format for both championships are identical. Each championship will have two stages: a first stage and a playoff stage. The first stage of each championship is a double round-robin format. The teams that finishes 1 and 2 in the standings will advance to the playoffs semifinals, while the teams that finish 3–6 will enter in the quarterfinals. The winner of each quarterfinals will advance to the semifinals. The winners of the semifinals will advance to the finals, which will determine the tournament champion.

Teams

Torneo Apertura

Results

Top scorers

Playoffs

Torneo Clausura

Results

Top scorers

Playoffs

Aggregate table

See also
Football in Guatemala

References

External links
 Guatefutbol 
 League stats RSSSF

Liga Nacional de Fútbol de Guatemala seasons
1
Guatemala